João Teves is a city in the central part of the island of Santiago, Cape Verde. It is situated 19 km northwest of the capital Praia, on the national road from Praia to Assomada (EN1-ST01). It is the seat of São Lourenço dos Órgãos municipality. A source river of the Ribeira Seca flows through the town.

References

Cities in Cape Verde
São Lourenço dos Órgãos
Teves, Joao
Geography of Santiago, Cape Verde